The Senator Fumaroles are a group of two fumaroles in Churchill County of the U.S. state of Nevada. Both fumaroles are outgassing steam and hydrogen sulfide.

References

Fumaroles
Volcanism of Nevada
Churchill County, Nevada